Bodh Gaya Assembly constituency is an assembly constituency and Kumar Sarvjeet is the MLA for Bihar Legislative Assembly in Gaya district of Bihar, India. It comes under Gaya (Lok Sabha constituency).

Members of Legislative Assembly

Election results

2020

References

External links
 

Assembly constituencies of Bihar